Saint John the Baptist Church (Surp Hovhannes Mkrtich) is a monumental Armenian Apostolic church in the town of Abovyan, Kotayk Province, Armenia.

Overview
The construction was launched in August 2006 and funded by the Armenian businessman Gagik Tsarukyan. After a 7-year duration of construction works, the church was finally consecrated in May 2013 by Catholicos Karekin II, with the presence of then-president of Armenia Serzh Sargsyan, president of Belarus Alexander Lukashenko and former president of Armenia Robert Kocharyan.

The main architect of the church is Artak Ghulyan, and the constructional engineers are Hovhannes Meyroyan and Tigran Dadayan. The internal paintings are the works of Abraham Azaryan and Hayk Azaryan. However, the creative team of the church grouped around 40 painters and sculptors.

Gallery

References

Buildings and structures in Kotayk Province
Armenian Apostolic churches in Armenia
Churches completed in 2013
2006 establishments in Armenia
Church buildings with domes